"Paul Tedford" (born February 2, 1988, in Albany, Georgia) Lived in Great Falls, Montana since 1993. Paul is an American athlete who competes in compound archery. He started shooting in 2000. Started shooting local and state competitions in 2001. Went to his first national competition in 2004 as a junior. Paul advanced to shooting as an amateur adult in 2007. His Professional career started when he registered "pro" in 2012.

Paul is a Pro Staff shooter for HOYT Archery.

References

External links
 
 Paul Tedford – PRIME Target Bows Athlete Page

1988 births
Living people
American male archers